District 3 can refer to:

III District, Turku, in Finland
District 3, Düsseldorf, in Germany
District 3, Grand Bassa County, in Liberia
District 3, Malta, an electoral district of Malta
District 3, a police district of Malta
Wiedikon, also known as District 3, in Zürich, Switzerland
District 3 (New York City Council), in the United States
District 3, Ho Chi Minh City, in Vietnam

Fiction
District3 (formerly GMD3), a three-piece harmony boy band on the ninth UK series of The X Factor
District 3 (The Hunger Games), a fictional district in the Hunger Games books and films

See also
District 3 Innovation Centre, a startup incubator and innovation hub in Concordia University, Montreal, Canada
District 13 (disambiguation)
Sector 3 (disambiguation)
3rd district (disambiguation)